Ailuk Airport  is a public use airstrip at Ailuk on Ailuk Atoll, Marshall Islands.

Airlines and destinations

References

Airports in the Marshall Islands